William John Phillips (30 January 1914 – 10 November 1982) was a New Zealand rugby union player. He was educated at Te Mata Primary School. He played seven matches for the All Blacks including three internationals, scoring two tries in all.

References

External links
 Photograph of Bill Phillips, Crown Studios Ltd :Negatives and prints. Ref: 1/2-205642-F. Alexander Turnbull Library, Wellington, New Zealand.

1914 births
1982 deaths
People from Raglan, New Zealand
New Zealand rugby union players
New Zealand international rugby union players
King Country rugby union players
Waikato rugby union players
Māori All Blacks players
Rugby union wings
Rugby union players from Waikato